General elections were held in Chile on 14 December 1989, bringing an end to the military regime that had been in place since 1973. Patricio Aylwin of Concertación alliance was elected President, whilst the alliance also won a majority of seats in the Chamber of Deputies and in the elected Senate seats.

From the 1989 elections onwards the military had officially left the political future of the country to civilians to be elected. Pinochet did not endorse any candidate publicly. Former dictatorship minister Hernán Büchi ran for president as candidate of the two right-wing parties, RN and UDI. He had little political experience and was a relatively young (40 years) technocrat credited for Chile's good economic performance in the later half of the 1980s. The right parties faced several problems in the elections: there was considerable infighting between RN and UDI, Büchi had only very reluctantly accepted to run for president and right-wing politicians struggled to define their position towards the Pinochet regime. In addition to this right-wing populist Francisco Javier Errázuriz Talavera ran independently for president and made several election promises Büchi could not match.

The centre-left coalition Concertación was rather united and confident. Its candidate Patricio Aylwin, a Christian Democrat, behaved as if he had won and refused a second television debate with Büchi. Büchi attacked Aylwin on a remark he had made concerning that inflation rate of 20% was not much and he also accused Aylwin of making secret agreements with the Communist Party of Chile, a party that was not part of Concertación. Aylwin spoke with strength about the need to clarify human rights violations but did not confront the dictatorship for it, in contrast Büchi as a regime collaborator lacked any credibility when dealing with human rights violations.

Büchi and Errázuriz lost to Patricio Aylwin. The electoral system meant that the largely Pinochet-sympathetic right was overrepresented in parliament in such way that it could block any reform to the constitution. This over-representation was crucial for UDI to obtain places in parliament and secure its political future. Pinochet declared himself to be satisfied with the election. The far-left and the far-right performed poorly in the election.

Results

President

Senate

Results by region

Chamber of Deputies

By region

References

Elections in Chile
General elections
Chile
Presidential elections in Chile
Chile